Mark Coeckelbergh (born 1975) is a Belgian philosopher of technology. He is Professor of Philosophy of Media and Technology at the Department of Philosophy of the University of Vienna and former President of the Society for Philosophy and Technology. He was previously Professor of Technology and Social Responsibility at De Montfort University in Leicester, UK, Managing Director of the 3TU Centre for Ethics and Technology, and a member of the Philosophy Department of the University of Twente. Before moving to Austria, he has lived and worked in Belgium, the UK, and the Netherlands. He is the author of several books, including Growing Moral Relations (2012), Human Being @ Risk (2013), Environmental Skill (2015), Money Machines (2015), New Romantic Cyborgs (2017), Moved by Machines (2019), the textbook Introduction to Philosophy of Technology (2019), and AI Ethics (2020).  He has written many articles and is an expert in ethics of artificial intelligence. He is best known for his work in philosophy of technology and ethics of robotics and artificial intelligence (AI), he has also published in the areas of moral philosophy and environmental philosophy.

Early life and education
Mark Coeckelbergh was born in 1975 in Leuven, Belgium. He was first educated in social sciences and political sciences at the University of Leuven (Licentiaat, 1997), before moving to the UK where he studied philosophy. He received his master's degree from the University of East Anglia (MA in Social Philosophy, 1999)  and his PhD from the University of Birmingham (PhD in Philosophy, 2003). During the time of his PhD study he also painted, wrote poems, played piano, and worked on engineering ethics at the University of Bath (UK) and at the Belgian nuclear research centre SCK-CEN.

Career
In 2003 he started teaching at the University of Maastricht in the Netherlands and in 2007 he was assistant professor at the Philosophy Department of the University of Twente, also in the Netherlands. In the same year he received the Prize of the Dutch Society for Bioethics (with J. Mesman). In Twente he started working on the ethics of robotics. In 2013 he became Managing Director of the 3TU Centre for Ethics and Technology. During his time in Twente he published many articles on philosophy of technology (especially robotics) and he was regularly interviewed about the ethics of drone technology. In 2014 he was appointed full professor, before the age of 40, at the Centre of Computing and Social Responsibility, De Montfort University in Leicester, UK, a position he held through early 2019. In 2014 he was nominated for the World Technology Awards in the Ethics category. In December 2015 he joined the Department of Philosophy of the University of Vienna as full Professor of Philosophy of Media and Technology.
Coeckelbergh is the President of the Society for Philosophy and Technology, a member of the High Level Expert Group on Artificial Intelligence for the European Commission, a member of the Austrian robotics council (Rat für Robotik), inaugurated by the Austrian Ministry for Transport, Innovation and Technology, and a member of the Austrian Advisory Council on Automated Mobility. He is also a member of the editorial advisory boards of AI and Sustainable Development, The AI Ethics Journal, Cognitive Systems Research, Science and Engineering Ethics, International Journal of Technoethics, Techne, Journal of Information, Communication and Ethics in Society,  Journal of Posthuman Studies, Kairos. Journal of Philosophy & Science, Technology & Regulation (TechReg), and The Journal of Sociotechnical Critique. Moreover, he is a fellow of the World Technology Network (WTN) and finalist of the World Technology Award 2017. Recently, Coeckelbergh joined the Technical Expertise Committee at the Foundation of Responsible Robotics, along with Charles Ess and Kevin Kelly.

Works
Following his articles on robot ethics and his book Growing Moral Relations, Coeckelbergh has been attributed a 'relational turn' in thinking about moral status. In his articles Coeckelbergh argues for a phenomenological and relational approach to the philosophy of robotics. His theory on 'Social Relationalism' in regards to Artificial Intelligence and Morality is discussed by Gunkel and Cripe in their paper entitled 'Apocalypse Not, or How I Learned to Stop Worrying and Love the Machine'. He has published mainly on robot ethics and ICT in health care, but also on many other topics. He also wrote a book on vulnerability and technology (Human Being @ Risk) in which he proposes an 'anthropology of vulnerability' and engages with discussions about human enhancement and transhumanism. His first books are about freedom, autonomy, and the role of imagination in moral reasoning. Later books discuss the problem of disengagement and distancing in the use of information and communication technologies (ICTs) and society's relation to the environment: in Environmental Skill he argues against modern and romantic ways of relating to the environment and in Money Machines he discusses new financial ICTs. In New Romantic Cyborgs he investigates the relation between technology and romanticism and reflects on what he calls "the end of the machine". He also wrote opinion articles in The Guardian and in Wired.

Books 
 
 
 
 
 
 AI Ethics (MIT Press, 2020) 
 Introduction to Philosophy of Technology (Oxford University Press, 2019) 
 Moved by Machines: Performance Metaphors and Philosophy of Technology (Routledge, 2019) 
 New Romantic Cyborgs: Romanticism, Information Technology, and the End of the Machine (MIT Press, 2017) 
 Money Machines: Electronic Financial Technologies, Distancing, and Responsibility in Global Finance (Ashgate, 2015) 
 Environmental Skill: Motivation, Knowledge, and the Possibility of a Non-Romantic Environmental Ethics (Routledge, 2015) 
 Human Being @ Risk: Enhancement, Technology, and the Evaluation of Vulnerability Transformations (Springer, 2013) 
 Growing Moral Relations: Critique of Moral Status Ascription (Palgrave Macmillan, 2012) 
 Imagination and Principles: An Essay on the Role of Imagination in Moral Reasoning (Palgrave Macmillan, 2007) 
 The Metaphysics of Autonomy: The Reconciliation of Ancient and Modern Ideals of the Person (Palgrave Macmillan, 2004)  
 Liberation and Passion: Reconstructing the Passion Perspective on Human Being and Freedom (DenkMal Verlag, 2002)

Reviews
Work by Coeckelbergh has been responded to by many academics, such as David Gunkel of Northern Illinois University, USA, who about 'Moved by Machines' writes: “This unique and innovative book changes the very framework for doing philosophy of technology by introducing and developing a performance-based method of analysis”.

Coeckelbergh's textbook on philosophy of technology,'Introduction to Philosophy of Technology', has been roundly praised by other academics working in the same field.  Shannon Vallor of Santa Clara University calls it a “model of philosophical clarity” while Diane Michelfelder of Macalster College rates the book as “...excellent. One can imagine students getting excited about the philosophy of technology, and philosophy in general, from reading Coeckelbergh's work.”

Coeckelbergh's book New Romantic Cyborgs has been described as offering 'a whole new way of looking at our use of technologies' and he has been called 'one of the most versatile, profound, and original thinkers in the contemporary philosophy of technology.' David Seng, University of Arizona, writes: 'One of the strengths of this book is that it is provides a critical process of inquiry and helpful analysis of inherited philosophical orientations regarding the relationship between technology and society.' A review by Roland Legrand for De Tijd especially compliments Mark Coeckelbergh's analysis of virtual worlds, among other aspects of the book.

Wendell Wallach of Yale University, USA, referring to 'Money Machines' comments: “Mark Coeckelbergh is recognized internationally for illuminating the manner in which information and communication technologies (ICTs) create new forms of “distancing” and in particular “moral distancing”. This important book extends that analysis to underscore the hidden ways ICTs shape money and global finance, alter relationships, and undermine responsibility”. Also, Keir James Cecil Martin writes about Money Machines: "Coeckelbergh’s view of money as a technology of relationality that shortens some geographical and temporal distances, whilst simultaneously widening moral and social gaps (…) has much to offer to anthropological debates on the nature of finance and money."

Marks publications that have been peer-reviewed and received reviews include: Money Machines  'Environmental Skill', 'Human Being @Risk'  and 'Growing Moral Relations'  as well as articles and other peer-reviewed research publications. For example, David Gunkel has written in his review in Ethics and Information Technology that Growing Moral Relations is 'a real game changer' and 'a penetrating analysis of moral status'. Jac Swart has called the book 'an important contribution to animal ethics' and Frank Jankunis says in his review that it is 'an impressive contribution to the literature on moral status'.

Yoni Van Den Eede has called Human Being @ Risk 'one of the most comprehensive and fine-grained in the current literature' and Pieter Lemmens has written that the book ''is thoroughly unique and original in showing the importance and extreme usefulness of philosophical anthropology and the phenomenological tradition for thinking through the consequences of the epochal technological mutations of our time'. Bert-Jaap Koops calls Human Being @ Risk  'an important and original book' and on the website of the Institute for Ethics and Emerging Technologies Nikki Olson writes: 'Coeckelbergh develops an impressive case that all our technological and social measures create new sources of vulnerability … Coeckelbergh drives home an important point for our debates about the human future. … Human Being @ Risk identifies important choices that we must debate as we imagine and (to a limited extent) plan the future of humanity. It raises issues that are fundamental to ongoing thinking about how to better the human condition.'

Carl Mitcham writes about Environmental Skill that it is 'an insightful argument for an environmental philosophy that draws on the resources of and at the same time extends work in philosophy of technology. The notion of skilled engagement with the world as this has emerged from pragmatism and phenomenology is here deepened and re-thought in an effort to understand and respond to the challenges of living in a techno-transformed nature.' Jochem Zwier and Andrea Gammon say in their critical but sympathetic review: 'One of the strong points of Coeckelbergh’s diagnosis is that it deepens the discussions regarding environmental concerns and the problem of motivation by laying bare the modern roots of these phenomena.' Tara Kennedy has published a review of the book in Notre Dame Philosophical Reviews. She writes: 'There is much for contemporary environmentalists to find compelling about Coeckelbergh's account, being not only an interesting analysis of the factors at work in motivation but also a convincing and optimistic approach to the problem.' She questions Coeckelbergh's interpretation of Heidegger but also praises 'Coeckelbergh's effectiveness in articulating a compelling account of the problem of motivation and how the development of an ethics of skilled engagement with the environment, a focus on habit and virtue, would find us better equipped to deal with the environmental crises we face. It is a welcome and interesting addition to a field in need of voices focused on bringing about meaningful, practical change.' And Louke van Wensveen writes in her review in the journal Environmental Ethics that the book reminds us of 'an overly autistic, obsessively controlling tendency in Western philosophical and everyday cultures. Such a distancing pattern and its ideological scaffolding prevent environmental action.'

Coeckelbergh's recent book New Romantic Cyborgs has been described as offering 'a whole new way of looking at our use of technologies' and he has been called 'one of the most versatile, profound, and original thinkers in the contemporary philosophy of technology.' David Seng, University of Arizona, writes: 'One of the strengths of this book is that it is provides a critical process of inquiry and helpful analysis of inherited philosophical orientations regarding the relationship between technology and society.' A review by Roland Legrand for De Tijd especially compliments Mark Coeckelbergh's analysis of virtual worlds, among other aspects of the book.

In the Media

Coeckelbergh has appeared regularly in Dutch (and British) media talking about the ethics of drone technology. He has talked about the ethical development of drones in relation to surveillance in an article for Kennislink entitled 'The Irrepressible Drone' and about the ethics of drone fighting for Universonline. He has been interviewed on live radio for BBC radio Leicester  where on 15 April 2015 he talked about drone technology and discussed robots that cook food.  On 11 June 2013 he appeared on Dutch national television for the Een Vandaag programme also talking about drones   and has appeared in articles for the Dutch newspaper Trouw on the subject of environmental philosophy  and 'Down To Earth' magazine (Netherlands) discussing drones for environmental purposes. In 2015 he was also interviewed about drones in Stedelijk Interieur, a Dutch magazine on public space.

In August and September 2015 Coeckelbergh's book "Money Machines" received media attention: he was interviewed on BBC Radio Leicester, in the Leicester Mercury where he warns for a growing reliance on computer algorithms in global finance, and in the Belgian national newspaper De Standaard, which printed a large article on the book in its weekend edition of 12 September 2015. In the De Standaard interview (in Dutch), Coeckelbergh warns that we might delegate too much to technology, and that we lack control and overview. The ethical and societal influence of new technologies may be invisible but is and remains powerful. But, he argues, if technology is part of the problem, it is also part of the solution: we need to develop new, alternative technologies and technological practices, also in the financial world.

Coeckelbergh has also been quoted in international mainstream media such as CNN and has a profile at the Guardian  due to many comments from readers responding to his article regarding his thoughts about the 2010 Deepwater Horizon oil spill. On 6 November 2012 Coeckelbergh was Interviewed by Stephen Edwards for a report appearing in the Economist newspaper Intelligence Unit (EIU) exploring the interaction between humans and technology.

In 2014 Coeckelbergh received much response on social media by other philosophers such as Evan Selinger  for his Wired magazine article with posts appearing on Twitter and Facebook.

Coeckelbergh's paper entitled 'Humans, Animals, and Robots: A Phenomenological Approach to Human-Robot Relations' was referenced in an online article for Dailydot.com entitled 'sex and love in the robot age' where human-robot relations were discussed. He also wrote an opinion article with Katleen Gabriels in the Dutch newspaper nrc.next which questions a call for banning sex robots and asks attention for (more) pressing societal issues, and was interviewed about his critical comments on the campaign in the Leicester Mercury.

In May 2017 he has been included in the top of tech pioneers named by the Belgian newspaper De Tijd, in the category leaders and thinkers.

Public Talks

Coeckelbergh has a long record of international public speaking appearances for diverse audiences at academic, public policy, legal, and business events. Recent examples since 2018 include the President's Keynote at SPT 2019 (Austin, TX), keynotes at ECSS 2018 (Gothenburg, Sweden), Robotiuris 2019 (Madrid, Spain), OtroMundo International Congress (Medellín, Colombia), SOLAIR 2019 (Prague, Czech Republic), INBOTS 2018 (Pisa, Italy),  and invited talks at University of Sydney's "Sydney Ideas" lecture series, Chung-Ang University (Seoul, South Korea), Beijing Forum 2019, UNAM (Universidad Nacional Autonoma de Mexico, Mexico City, Mexico), Workshop at Illinois Institute of Technology (Chicago, Illinois), and others.

A full listing of his talks can be found on his website.

Academics References
From his more than 100 academic publications Coeckelbergh has been cited hundreds of times, for example his publications in Ethical Theory & Moral Practice, Science, Technology and Human Values, Ethics and Information Technology, International Journal of Social Robotics, and AI & Society. Human Being @ Risk (2013) is his most cited book.

References

External links

blog
twitter page
Research group Philosophy of Media and Technology at University of Vienna

1975 births
Living people
Alumni of the University of East Anglia
Alumni of the University of Birmingham
21st-century Belgian philosophers
Artificial intelligence researchers
Artificial intelligence ethicists
KU Leuven alumni
Academic staff of Maastricht University
Academic staff of the University of Twente
Academics of De Montfort University
Academic staff of the University of Vienna
People from Leuven